Albert D. Whealdon (May 18, 1868 – November 29, 1963) was an American politician and educator.

Born in Caldwell, Ohio, Whealdon went to Warrensburg Teachers College. He then received his bachelor's degree from University of Missouri and his master's degree from University of Wisconsin–Madison. He also went to Humboldt University of Berlin. He taught in high school and later taught chemistry at Superior State Teachers College (now University of Wisconsin–Superior). In 1942, Whealdon served on the Superior, Wisconsin Common Council and was president of the common council. In 1947, Whealdon served in the Wisconsin State Assembly and was a Republican.

Notes

1868 births
1963 deaths
People from Caldwell, Ohio
Politicians from Superior, Wisconsin
Humboldt University of Berlin alumni
University of Central Missouri alumni
University of Missouri alumni
University of Wisconsin–Madison alumni
University of Wisconsin–Superior
Educators from Wisconsin
Wisconsin city council members
Republican Party members of the Wisconsin State Assembly
Educators from Ohio